Jocky Petrie may refer to:

Jocky Petrie (chef), British chef
Jocky Petrie (footballer) (1860s–?), Scottish football player